Brian Perry may refer to:

 Brian Perry (cricketer) (1943–2017), English cricketer
 Brian Perry (ice hockey) (born 1944), former ice hockey left wing
 Brian Perry (musician) American hard rock bassist for bands like Dirty Looks, Lizzy Borden, and Prong
 Brian Perry (veterinarian) (born 1946), British veterinary surgeon and epidemiologist